Albina Khamitovna Akhatova (born 13 November 1976) is a Russian (of Tatar origin) former biathlete. She was banned for two years for doping.

Career
At the 2006 Winter Olympics in Turin, she won bronze medals in the  pursuit and  individual; she originally finished fourth in the individual but was promoted when her teammate Olga Pyleva was disqualified after failing a doping test. She also won gold, silver, and bronze medals in Olympic relay competitions in 2006, 1998, and 2002, respectively.

Akhatova also won the gold medals in the mass start at the 2003 World Championship held in Khanty-Mansiysk. In 1999 in Oslo, she won the bronze medal, and in 2004 in Oberhof, Germany, she won the silver medal, both over the distance of 15 km. She also was part of Russia's winning relay teams at the 2000 and 2003 World Championships.

After a break in the 2006/07 season, she returned in January 2008. At the 2008 World Championships in Östersund, she won the silver medal in the  sprint and the bronze medal in the subsequent 10 km pursuit.

Doping case
On 13 February 2009 the IBU announced that Akhatova, along with teammates Ekaterina Iourieva and Dmitri Yaroshenko, had tested positive for EPO during the World Cup in Östersund. On 11 August 2009, each was banned for two years.

See also
 List of sportspeople sanctioned for doping offences

References

External links

 
 
 

1976 births
Living people
People from Nikolsky District, Vologda Oblast
Biathletes at the 1998 Winter Olympics
Biathletes at the 2002 Winter Olympics
Biathletes at the 2006 Winter Olympics
Doping cases in biathlon
Olympic biathletes of Russia
Olympic gold medalists for Russia
Olympic silver medalists for Russia
Olympic bronze medalists for Russia
Russian female biathletes
Olympic medalists in biathlon
Biathlon World Championships medalists
Medalists at the 2006 Winter Olympics
Medalists at the 2002 Winter Olympics
Medalists at the 1998 Winter Olympics
Russian sportspeople in doping cases
Recipients of the Medal of the Order "For Merit to the Fatherland" I class
Recipients of the Medal of the Order "For Merit to the Fatherland" II class
Sportspeople from Vologda Oblast